Aldrichomyia is a genus of flies in the family Tachinidae.

Species
Aldrichomyia macropogon Bigot, 1889

Distribution
United States.

References

Diptera of North America
Dexiinae
Tachinidae genera
Monotypic Brachycera genera